Shimanto Square is a shopping center  in Dhaka, Bangladesh. It is managed by Border Guard Bangladesh.

Location
The complex is located near the Pilkhana, Bangladesh BDR gate road number 4, Dhanmondi, Dhaka, is opposite Dhanmondi Lake, neighboring residential areas of Dhaka city like Gulshan, Banani, and Baridhara. It is near educational institutions, international schools and University of Dhaka.

About
Shimanto square is a modern shopping mall with some 360 shops.  It has a food court with around 16 outlets.

Gallery

See also
List of shopping malls in Bangladesh

References

 Shimanto Square Food Court

Proposed buildings and structures in Bangladesh
Shopping malls in Dhaka